Judge Burns may refer to:

Ellen Bree Burns (1923–2019), judge of the United States District Court for the District of Connecticut
James M. Burns (judge) (1924–2001), judge of the United States District Court for the District of Oregon
Larry Alan Burns (born 1954), judge of the United States District Court for the Southern District of California
Louis Henry Burns (1878–1928), judge of the United States District Court for the Eastern District of Louisiana
Owen McIntosh Burns (1892–1952), judge of the United States District Court for the Western District of Pennsylvania
Tara Burns (fl. 1990s–2020s), judge of the High Court of Ireland
Waller Thomas Burns (1858–1917), judge of the United States District Court for the Southern District of Texas